Nasdaq First North Growth Market is a division of Nasdaq Nordic and an alternative stock exchange (legally a multilateral trading facility) for smaller companies in Europe. The market place Nya Marknaden in Stockholm changed name to First North in June 2006 and the First North exchange expanded to the stock exchange on Iceland in January 2007 and Helsinki in April 2007.

First North uses a less extensive rulebook than the main market. Unlike the regulated main market, every company on First North has a Certified Adviser to ensure that companies comply with all requirements and rules. It shares a single trading system with the main markets.

See also
Stock market lists
List of stock exchanges
List of European stock exchanges
Nasdaq Copenhagen
Nasdaq Stockholm
Nasdaq Helsinki
Nasdaq Vilnius
Nasdaq Riga
Nasdaq Tallinn
Nasdaq Iceland

Other lists
List of Danish companies
List of Finnish companies
List of Icelandic companies
List of Swedish companies

References

External links 
Nasdaq First North website

Stock exchanges in Europe